Petaluma (Miwok: Péta Lúuma) is a city in Sonoma County, California, located in the North Bay region of the San Francisco Bay Area. Its population was 59,776 according to the 2020 census.

Petaluma's name comes from the Miwok village named Péta Lúuma, that was located on the banks of the Petaluma River. The modern city originates in Rancho Petaluma, granted in 1834 to famed Californio statesman Mariano Guadalupe Vallejo, considered to be the founder of Petaluma. Today, Petaluma is known for its well-preserved historic center and as a local hub for the Petaluma Valley region of Sonoma County.

History

The Coast Miwok resided throughout Marin and southern Sonoma County.

The Petaluma area was part of a  1834 Mexican land grant by Governor Jose Figueroa to Mariano Guadalupe Vallejo called Rancho Petaluma. In 1836, Vallejo ordered construction of his Rancho Petaluma Adobe, a ranch house in Petaluma, which his family often used as a summer home, while he resided in the neighboring town of Sonoma. Vallejo's influence and Mexican control in the region began to decline after Vallejo's arrest during the Bear Flag Revolt in 1846.

Pioneers moved to Petaluma from the eastern United States after James Marshall found gold in the Sierra Nevada in 1848. The town's position on the Petaluma River in the heart of productive farmland was critical to its growth during the 19th and early 20th centuries. Sailing scows, such as the scow schooner Alma (1892), and steamers plied the river between Petaluma and San Francisco, carrying agricultural produce and raw materials to the burgeoning city of San Francisco during the California Gold Rush.

There were brothels downtown along Petaluma Boulevard, which used to be the main thoroughfare until U.S. Highway 101 was constructed in the 1950s. The Petaluma Historic Commercial District is listed on the National Register of Historic Places.

The Sonoma County Bank Building was the home of the Baker Creek Heirloom Seed Company and the Petaluma Seed Bank until 2019. It was built in 1926.

Petaluma soon became known for its grain milling and chicken processing industries, which continue to the present as a smaller fraction of its commerce. At one time, Petaluma was known as the "Egg Capital of the World," sparking such nicknames as "Chickaluma". Petaluma hosted the only known poultry drugstore and is the place where the egg incubator was invented by Lyman Byce in 1879.

One of the largest historic chicken processing plants still stands in the central area of town; this 1930s brick building is no longer used for the chicken industry, but is being evaluated for preservation and change of use. Even though it is no longer known as the Egg Capital of the World, Petaluma maintains a strong agricultural base today with dairy farms, olive groves, vineyards, and berry and vegetable farms.

According to the Army Museum at the Presidio, San Francisco, Petaluma was relatively unharmed during the San Francisco earthquake of April 18, 1906, due to significant stable bedrock underlying the region. As one of the few communities in the region left standing after the earthquake, Petaluma was the staging point for most Sonoma County rescue and relief efforts.

Petaluma is today the location of many distinguished, well-preserved pre-1906 buildings and Victorian homes on the western side of the river. The downtown area has suffered many river floods over the years and during the Depression commerce declined. A lack of funds prevented the demolition of the old homes and buildings. In the 1960s there was a counter-culture migration out of San Francisco into Marin County and southern Sonoma County, looking for inexpensive housing in a less urban environment. The old Victorian, Queen Anne and Eastlake style houses were restored. Historic iron-front buildings in the downtown commercial district were also rescued. Traffic and new home development for the most part was rerouted to the east of downtown by the construction of the 101 freeway.

The first official airmail flight took place in 1911, when Fred Wiseman carried a handful of mail from Petaluma to Santa Rosa, including letters from Petaluma postmaster John E. Olmstead and the mayor of Petaluma. Wiseman's plane ended up in the National Air and Space Museum.

There was a substantial influx of Jewish residents to the area in the first three decades of the 20th century. Most of the settlers were secular Eastern European Jews; they founded today's B'nai Israel Jewish Center as a secular Jewish community center with no rabbi and only a small area for prayer. The community became active in the poultry industry, and some settlers joined the local labor movement and participated in leftist political organizing, leading to significant conflicts between integrationists who aimed to quietly integrate into Petaluma society and socialists who hoped to change it.

With its large stock of historic buildings, Petaluma has been used as the filming location for numerous movies set in the 1940s, '50s, and '60s (see list of movies below). The historic McNear Building is a common film location.

Petaluma pioneered the time-controlled approach to development. After Highway 101 was re-aligned as a freeway in 1955, residential development permits tripled, from 300 in 1969 to 900 in 1971. Because of the region's soaring population in the sixties, the city enacted the "Petaluma Plan" in 1971. This plan limited the number of building permits to 500 annually for a five-year period beginning in 1972. At the same time Petaluma created a redbelt around the town as a boundary for urban expansion for a stated number of years. Similar to Ramapo, New York, a Residential Development Control System was created to distribute the building permits based on a point system conforming to the city's general plan to provide for low and moderate income housing and divide development somewhat equally between east and west and single family and multi-family housing.

The stated objectives of Petaluma's time controlled growth management were to ensure orderly growth; to protect the city's small town character and surrounding green space; to provide a variety of housing choices; and to maintain adequate water supply and sewage treatment facilities.

The controlled development plan attracted national attention in 1975 when the city was taken to court by the Construction Industry Association. This court ruling still forms the foundation for most local growth management ordinances in California.

Despite this history of planned development, the Petaluma City Council voted on April 13, 2009, to eliminate the entire planning department and lay off the whole planning staff. Planning Division responsibilities were subsequently contracted out to the consulting firm Metropolitan Planning Group, which re-hired some of the former planning staff and continues to operate planning services for the city.

In the late 1990s, Petaluma was also known as Telecom Valley due to the telecom startup companies that seemed to multiply from one another, and offer great riches for early stockholders and employees. Two success stories were that of Advanced Fibre Communications (AFC) (now Tellabs), and Cerent, which was purchased by Cisco. Some Cerent employees went on to purchase the Phoenix Theater, a local entertainment venue, which was once an opera house.

In 2021, Petaluma established a goal of achieving carbon neutrality by 2030. In March of that year, the city formally prohibited construction of new gas stations, becoming the first municipality in the world to enact such a ban. The city also streamlined the process of building EV charging stations and potential hydrogen filling stations.

The city has identified about two dozen buildings and districts as Petaluma landmarks.

Geography

Water is 0.74% of the total area.

Petaluma is flanked by the unincorporated communities of Penngrove to the north and Lakeville to the south.

Petaluma is situated at the northernmost navigable end of the Petaluma River, a tidal estuary that snakes southward to San Pablo Bay. Pollution levels in the river, once considerable, have improved in recent years. A significant amount of the city is in the river's flood plain, which overflows its banks every few years, particularly in the Payran neighborhood.

Principal environmental noise sources are U.S. Route 101, Petaluma Boulevard, Washington Street and other major arteries. The number of residents that live in a zone of noise exposure greater than 60 CNEL is approximately 4,000.

Climate
Petaluma has a mild Mediterranean climate (Köppen: Csb). Its dry summer is characterized by typically warm days and cool nights with a large degree of diurnal temperature variation. Summer mornings often start out foggy and chilly, but the fog usually clears by midday or so, giving way to clear skies and warmth for the remainder of the day. Winter is cool and rainy, with frost occasionally occurring on clear nights.

Demographics

2020

Data released by the United States Census Bureau reports that per the 2020 United States Census, Petaluma had a population of 59,776. There were 22,756 households, with an average of 2.61 occupants. The population density increased to 4,146.8 per square mile compared to 2010. The largest demographic groups remained Whites (75.9%) and Hispanics (21.6%), followed by Asians (4.2%), African Americans (1.3%), and Native Americans (0.8%). 22.0% of households in Petaluma report speaking a language other than English. Furthermore, 14.9% of residents were foreign-born.

The city's population (in terms of sex) was practically evenly split, with 50.1% of residents being female, and 49.9% being male. More than one-fifth (20.6%) of Petaluma's residents were under the age of 18, while 18.7% are senior citizens aged 65 and over. Nine-tenths (90.5%) of the population had graduated high school, with 40.3% of residents having obtained a Bachelor's degree or higher level of education.

The median household income was reported to be $100,379 in 2021 dollars, with a per capita income of $50,664. The median gross rent in Petaluma was measured to be $2,144, with the labor force participation rate having leveled off at 65.7%. The rate of poverty in the city changed only marginally between 2010 and 2020, slightly decreasing to 5.9%.

2010

The 2010 United States Census reported that Petaluma had a population of 57,941. The population density was 3,998.9 people per square mile. The racial makeup of Petaluma was 46,566 (80.4%) White, 801 (1.4%) African American, 353 (0.6%) Native American, 2,607 (4.5%) Asian (1.3% Chinese, 0.9% Filipino, 0.8% Asian Indian, 0.4% Japanese, 0.3% Vietnamese, 0.2% Korean, 0.1% Pakistani, 0.1% Laotian, 0.1% Thai), 129 (0.2%), Pacific Islander, 5,103 (8.8%) from other races, and 2,382 (4.1%) from two or more races. Hispanic or Latino of any race were 12,453 persons (21.5%). The Latino ethnic groups are Mexicans (16.2%), Salvadorans (1.2%), Guatemalans (0.6%), Nicaraguans (0.3%), Peruvians (0.3%), and Puerto Ricans (0.3%).

The Census reported that 57,217 people (98.8% of the population) lived in households, 361 (0.6%) lived in non-institutionalized group quarters, and 363 (0.6%) were institutionalized.

There were 21,737 households, out of which 7,541 (34.7%) had children under the age of 18 living in them, 11,392 (52.4%) were opposite-sex married couples living together, 2,257 (10.4%) had a female householder with no husband present, 1,052 (4.8%) had a male householder with no wife present. There were 1,319 (6.1%) unmarried opposite-sex partnerships, and 207 (1.0%) same-sex married couples or partnerships. 5,372 households (24.7%) were made up of individuals, and 2,366 (10.9%) had someone living alone who was 65 years of age or older. The average household size was 2.63. There were 14,701 families (67.6% of all households); the average family size was 3.14.

The population was spread out, with 13,455 people (23.2%) under the age of 18, 4,589 people (7.9%) aged 18 to 24, 15,041 people (26.0%) aged 25 to 44, 17,273 people (29.8%) aged 45 to 64, and 7,583 people (13.1%) who were 65 years of age or older. The median age was 40.3 years. For every 100 females, there were 96.3 males. For every 100 females age 18 and over, there were 93.8 males.

There were 22,736 housing units at an average density of 1,569.2 per square mile, of which 14,159 (65.1%) were owner-occupied, and 7,578 (34.9%) were occupied by renters. The homeowner vacancy rate was 1.3%; the rental vacancy rate was 4.8%. 37,389 people (64.5% of the population) lived in owner-occupied housing units and 19,828 people (34.2%) lived in rental housing units.

2000

As of the census of 2000, there were 54,548 people, 19,932 households, and 14,012 families residing in the city. The population density was 3,953 people per square mile. There were 20,304 housing units at an average density of 1,471/sq mi. The racial makeup of the city was 84.16% White, 1.16% African American, 0.54% Native American, 3.91% Asian, 0.17% Pacific Islander, 6.08% from other races, and 3.98% from two or more races. 14.64% of the population were Hispanic.

There were 19,932 households, out of which 36.6% had children under the age of 18 living with them, 55.3% were married couples living together, 10.6% had a female householder with no husband present, and 29.7% were non-families. 22.6% of all households were made up of individuals, and 9.1% had someone living alone who was 65 years of age or older. The average household size was 2.70 and the average family size was 3.16. The age distribution is: 26.2% under the age of 18, 7.2% from 18 to 24, 31.5% from 25 to 44, 24.1% from 45 to 64, and 11.0% who were 65 years of age or older. The median age was 37 years. For every 100 females, there were 95.6 males. For every 100 females age 18 and over, there were 91.9 males.

The median income for a household in the city was $61,679, and the median income for a family was $71,158 (these figures had risen to $68,949 and $85,513, respectively, as of a 2007 estimate). Males had a median income of $50,232 versus $36,413 for females. The per capita income for the city was $27,087. About 3.3% of families and 6.0% of the population were below the poverty line, including 6.2% of those under age 18 and 7.1% of those age 65 or over.

Economy

Amy's Kitchen, Calix Inc., CamelBak, Clover Stornetta Farms, Lagunitas Brewing Company, and Petaluma Poultry. are based in Petaluma. Mesa Boogie and Enphase Energy were also founded in Petaluma.

Top employers
According to the city's 2021 Comprehensive Annual Financial Report, the top employers in the city are:

Military

U.S. Coast Guard
The U.S. Coast Guard operates Training Center Petaluma just outside Petaluma, near Two Rock. It operates several of its class "A" and "C" schools at TRACEN Petaluma, including the Electronics Technician (ET), Culinary Specialist (CS), Health Service Technician (HS), Information Systems Technician (IT), Operation Specialist (OS), Storekeeper (SK), and Yeoman (YN) schools.

The Coast Guard also operates the Chief Petty Officer Academy at the TRACEN. Academy trains senior non-commissioned officers (Chief Petty Officers) for both the U.S. Coast Guard and the U.S. Air Force.

California National Guard
The California National Guard operates an armed forces facility in Petaluma, at 580 Vallejo Street.

Parks and recreation
Immediately to the southwest is Helen Putnam Regional Park, accessible from Chileno Valley Road. This park of  has trails for hiking, cycling and horseback riding and is one of two parks named in honor of former mayor Helen Putnam who served from 1965 to 1979; the other is Putnam Plaza on Petaluma Boulevard. Lying above the city of Petaluma on the northwest flank of Sonoma Mountain is the Fairfield Osborn Preserve, a nature reserve with a diversity of native plants and animals. Nearby to the southeast is Tolay Lake, the site of prehistoric seasonal settlement by Miwok and Pomo tribes.

Government

The mayor of Petaluma is Teresa Barrett, who was formerly the vice mayor, and has previously served on the Petaluma City Council. The other six council members are Brian Barnacle (Vice Mayor), D'Lynda Fischer, Mike Healy, Dave King, Kevin McDonnell and Dennis Pocekay.

State and federal representation

According to the California Secretary of State, as of February 10, 2019, Petaluma has 36,034 registered voters. Of those, 18,779 (52.1%) are registered Democrats, 6,124 (17%) are registered Republicans, and 9,281 (25.8%) have declined to state a political party.

Education

Public schools are managed by the Petaluma City School District. There are two comprehensive high schools in Petaluma: Petaluma High School and Casa Grande High School, whose athletic teams are known as the Trojans and Gauchos respectively. Casa Grande High School has a notable Academic Decathlon team, which has represented Sonoma County for the last 27 years in the state-level competition. There is an annual football game between the two schools' teams known as the "Egg Bowl". The Game was suspended in 2011 for fights involving players and fans, but was brought back in 2017, with Petaluma winning the game over Casa Grande, 20–14. The two Petaluma public middle schools are Kenilworth Junior High School and Petaluma Junior High School.

St. Vincent de Paul High School, a Roman Catholic private school, is in Petaluma, and its athletic teams are known as the Mustangs. Santa Rosa Junior College has a second campus in Petaluma, and the campus the unaccredited art school/atelier l'Atelier aux Couleurs is located in Petaluma. Harvest Christian School is a private Christian school in Petaluma, serving grades TK-8.

Infrastructure

Transportation
U.S. Highway 101 is the main freeway through town. State Route 116 also runs through town as Lakeville Highway. Other major streets include East Washington Street, North and South McDowell Boulevards, and Petaluma Boulevard.

Petaluma is served by Petaluma Transit, Golden Gate Transit and by Sonoma County Transit bus services. The Sonoma–Marin Area Rail Transit (SMART) rail line inaugurated service in August 2017 and serves Petaluma–Downtown station, adjacent to the historic Northwestern Pacific Railroad depot near Washington Street. A second station, Petaluma–North, is planned for future construction and service.

The nearest major airports are San Francisco International Airport and Oakland International Airport, Sonoma County Airport Express buses connect Petaluma with the aforementioned airports. General aviation is served by the Petaluma Municipal Airport, as well as the Charles M. Schulz – Sonoma County Airport located north of Santa Rosa.

Notable people

Actors 

Winona Ryder (born 1971), actor; graduated from Petaluma High School in 1989
Myron Healey (1923-2005), actor
Lloyd Bridges (1913-1998), actor; graduated from Petaluma High School in 1930

Artists 
David Best (born 1945), sculptor, lives and works in Petaluma, known for Burning Man creations
Mark di Suvero (born 1933), sculptor, lived and worked in Petaluma, 1975-
Mary Fuller McChesney (1922-2022), sculptor, lived on Sonoma Mountain, 1953-2019
Robert P. McChesney (1913-2008), painter, lived on Sonoma Mountain, 1953-2008

Businesspeople 
Kevin Tsujihara (born 1964), former chairman and CEO of Warner Bros.

Video game designers 
Jake Rodkin, video game designer, graphic designer, podcaster
Bill Tiller (born 1967), computer game designer, writer, and artist, known for his work at LucasArts.
Jeff Gerstmann (born 1975), prominent video game personality known for his podcasting and work at GameSpot and Giant Bomb.

Historical figures 
Richard A. Penry (1948-1994), soldier and Medal of Honor recipient

Musicians and bands 
Sean Hayes (born 1969), singer and songwriter
Em Rossi (born 1998), singer and songwriter

Sports figures 
Bruce Bochte (born 1950), baseball player
Steven Cozza (born 1985), professional road bicycle racer
Joe Enochs (born 1971), soccer player for VfL Osnabrück
Jonny Gomes (born 1980), baseball player
Duke Iversen (1920-2011), football player
Spencer Torkelson (born 1999) baseball player
Elijah Qualls (born 1995), football player

Writers 
Shirley Neilsen Blum (born 1932), American art historian, author, gallerist, curator, and professor; born in Petaluma.
Tobias Capwell (born ), American curator, military historian and jouster; born in Petaluma
Pauline Kael (1919-2001), movie critic
Karen Kilgariff (born 1970), comedian, podcaster and writer
Bill Pronzini (born 1943), mystery writer
Silver Tree, film writer and producer

Other 
Nicole Aunapu Mann (born 1977), USMC fighter pilot and NASA astronaut.

In popular culture 

 The song "Petaluma Afternoons" appeared on the 1998 album Time Between Trains by folk singer Susan Werner.
 In the computer game Sim City 2000, "Petaluma" is frequently a neighboring community to the city that the player builds.
 The 2007 Michael Ondaatje novel Divisadero is partly set on a farm situated near Petaluma.
 A musical piece called And on the Seventh Day Petals Fell in Petaluma, inspired by a garden in Petaluma, was created by Harry Partch in 1963.
 Petaluma is briefly mentioned by a suitor in the 1971 comedy film Harold and Maude.
 In the episode of the television show M*A*S*H 'The Topper', character B.J. Hunnicutt mentions a "Petaluma lumberjack festival."
 In Nickelodeon's The Mighty B! a freeway overpass has a Petaluma sign on it.
 In the Peanuts comics series, Snoopy the beagle trains for an arm wrestling event in Petaluma (but is disqualified because he has no thumb).
In an episode of the 1970s television series Emergency!, fireman Chet Kelley mentions trying out for the Arm Wrestling Championship in Petaluma, but loses to another applicant before making the trip.
 In their song The Days of the Phoenix from their September 2000 album titled The Art of Drowning, the punk rock band AFI makes reference to the Phoenix Theater on Washington Street in downtown Petaluma, a venue the band used to play on a regular basis.
 In the film One Way Passage (1932) starring William Powell, Kay Francis, Aline MacMahon, Frank McHugh, and Warren Hymer playing a police detective, Hymer tries to woo actress Aline MacMahon by telling her he wants to quit police work and retire to his fully paid for chicken ranch in Petaluma.
 California's Gold Episode 2009
 2016 film American Wrestler: The Wizard is set in Petaluma.
 The 1973 George Lucas film American Graffiti was filmed mostly on location in Petaluma.

See also

 List of cities and towns in California
 List of cities and towns in the San Francisco Bay Area
 Petaluma Gap
 Petaluma Reservoir
 Petaluma Wildlife Museum
 United States Post Office (Petaluma, California)

References

External links

 
 Petaluma Downtown
 Petaluma 2004/05 General Plan
 Historical and scenic photos of Petaluma by Michael Maggid
 Bicycling map

 
1858 establishments in California
Cities in Sonoma County, California
Cities in the San Francisco Bay Area
History of Sonoma County, California
Incorporated cities and towns in California
Populated places established in 1858